The Latino World Order (abbreviated lWo or LWO) was a professional wrestling stable that existed in World Championship Wrestling (WCW) in 1998 and 1999 led by Eddie Guerrero. The name of the stable was invented by Jason Hervey and was inspired by and intended as a mockery of the famous New World Order (nWo).

History

Concept
The LWO was formed in late 1998 after Eddie Guerrero's spat with WCW head Eric Bischoff, a real-life conflict that was turned into a storyline. The group was the idea of Jason Hervey, a friend of Bischoff. The stable was originally supposed to revolve around Konnan, but it was given to Guerrero after Konnan joined the nWo Wolfpac.

Beginnings
On August 17, Guerrero gave a shoot, where he claimed to want out of his contract. After being taken off television for several weeks, Guerrero returned on the October 5 edition of WCW Monday Nitro, forming the LWO with several other Mexican wrestlers. The group consisted of the majority of the Mexican roster, as well as Guerrero's friend Art Flores, who played the role of a bodyguard named Spyder.

The group consisted of almost every major Mexican wrestler on the WCW roster including Psychosis, La Parka, Hector Garza, and Juventud Guerrera. Their main feud lay with Rey Mysterio, Jr., after he refused to join the group. They also feuded with Billy Kidman, Mysterio's on-and-off American tag team partner. Mysterio was forced to become a member after losing a match to Eddie Guerrero. Chavo Guerrero Jr. attempted to join several times, but Eddie did not allow it because Chavo was (kayfabe) mentally unstable at the time and carried around a wooden horse named Pepé.

Demise and aftermath
A car accident suffered by Guerrero on January 1, 1999 would help bring a premature end to the LWO. Three days later, the two factions of the New World Order reunited, and before long, various members of the LWO were found lying unconscious backstage. The nWo approached the LWO and demanded they immediately disband or face further consequences. The next week, Ric Flair also asked the LWO to disband and fight for WCW, promising he would treat them better than Bischoff did and also promising them money, women and limousines. Every member other than Mysterio agreed, removing their LWO shirts and exiting the ring. Mysterio, who was not originally a willing member of the group, proved himself the most loyal when he refused to remove his LWO colors. The nWo beat him down and forcibly tore off his LWO shirt, leading to a feud between Mysterio and The Outsiders.

The reunited nWo also betrayed their only Latino member, Konnan, who objected to the brutality used against Mysterio, leading them to form a team against The Outsiders. As Eddie Guerrero healed and made his in-ring return, key LWO members such as himself, Mysterio, and Juventud Guerrera formed a popular new group with Konnan known as The Filthy Animals.

Legacy
In 2020, Santos Escobar formed the Legado Del Fantasma stable with its logo paying homage to the lWo stable.

Members
Eddie Guerrero (leader and forms the Latino World Order on the October 5, 1998 episode of Nitro, Guerrero was involved in a car accident on January 1, 1999, disbands by WCW President Ric Flair on the January 11, 1999 episode of Nitro)
Héctor Garza (joined on the October 5, 1998 episode of Nitro, Garza becomes the second member of Eddie's LWO, disbands by WCW President Ric Flair on the January 11, 1999 episode of Nitro)
Damián (joined on the October 5, 1998 episode of Nitro, Damián becomes the third member of Eddie's LWO, disbands by WCW President Ric Flair on the January 11, 1999 episode of Nitro)
El Dandy (joined on the October 8, 1998 episode of WCW Thunder, El Dandy wrestled against Tokyo Magnum, but the IWGP Heavyweight Champion Scott Norton powerbombs both Dandy & Magnum for the DQ, El Dandy becomes the fourth member of Eddie's LWO, disbands by WCW President Ric Flair on the January 11, 1999 episode of Nitro)
Psychosis (joined on the October 12, 1998 episode of Nitro after a six-man tag team match, Psychosis becomes the fifth member of Eddie's LWO, disbands by WCW President Ric Flair on the January 11, 1999 episode of Nitro)
La Parka (joined on the October 19, 1998 episode of Nitro after a eight-man tag team match, La Parka becomes the sixth member of Eddie's LWO, disbands by WCW President Ric Flair on the January 11, 1999 episode of Nitro)
Spyder (Arturo "Art" Flores) (joined on the October 26, 1998 episode of Nitro as the bodyguard, Spyder becomes the seventh member of Eddie's LWO, disbands by WCW President Ric Flair on the January 11, 1999 episode of Nitro)
Rey Mysterio, Jr. (joined on the November 16, 1998 episode of Nitro, Rey Mysterio, Jr. wrestled against Eddie Guerrero, if Rey wins, Eddie will leave him alone, if Eddie wins, Rey must join the LWO, Mysterio lost the match to Guerrero, Mysterio becomes the eighth member of Eddie's LWO, disbands by WCW President Ric Flair on the January 11, 1999 episode of Nitro)
Juventud Guerrera (joined on the November 22, 1998 episode of WCW World War 3 as the WCW Cruiserweight Champion, but lost the title to Billy Kidman with help from Rey Mysterio, Jr., Guerrera becomes the ninth member of Eddie's LWO, disbands by WCW President Ric Flair on the January 11, 1999 episode of Nitro)
Ciclope (joined on the December 3, 1998 episode of WCW Thunder, Ciclope wrestled against Eddie Guerrero, but Guerrero stopped the match, Ciclope becomes the tenth member of Eddie's LWO, disbands by WCW President Ric Flair on the January 11, 1999 episode of Nitro)
Silver King (joined on the December 5, 1998 episode of WCW Saturday Night, King lost a match to Disco Inferno, King becomes the eleventh member of Eddie's LWO, disbands by WCW President Ric Flair on the January 11, 1999 episode of Nitro)
Villano V (joined on the December 14, 1998 episode of Nitro, Villano V wrestled against Eddie Guerrero, but Guerrero stopped the match, Villano V becomes the twelfth member of Eddie's LWO, disbands by WCW President Ric Flair on the January 11, 1999 episode of Nitro)

References

World Championship Wrestling teams and stables
American professional wrestlers of Mexican descent
Mexican culture
1998 in professional wrestling
Parodies